An Phú is a ward (phường) of Thu Duc in Ho Chi Minh City, Vietnam.

References 

Populated places in Ho Chi Minh City